Jail (stylized as JAIL) is an American reality television series that follows suspected criminals from booking through incarceration. The series was created and produced by John Langley and his son, Morgan Langley, through their Langley television and film Productions company. They also produce Cops.

History
The show originally premiered on Court TV as Inside American Jail in 2005. It was repackaged for MyNetworkTV's 2007 Fall schedule as simply Jail beginning September 4, 2007 with a different theme song, "Get Me Out", performed by rapper Lil' Droppa. It was later syndicated on TruTV (A rebrand of the original Court TV) under its original name, and Spike TV, under its current title. The show ran initially for three seasons and was distributed by 20th Century Fox Television.

The booking of O. J. Simpson into the Clark County, Nevada Detention Center was featured in the show's February 12, 2008 episode.

In 2014, Spike revived the series as Jail: Las Vegas; shifting focus to jails in the eponymous city. The network ordered a 22-episode season which premiered on January 10, 2015.

In January 2016, it was announced on the show's Facebook page that Spike had renewed Jail for a fifth season. In April, the season's title was announced as Jail: Big Texas; focusing on jails in the state of Texas. The fifth season premiered on Saturday, July 9, 2016.

As of 2019 the tv series has been cancelled by Spike to allow airtime for sister show Cops. As of 2022, reruns of both series air on the cable channel Reelz, often in back-to-back blocks and episodes and clips on YouTube.

Series overview

Notes

References

External links

Jail on Spike's website
Inside American Jail on TruTV's website

MyNetworkTV original programming
Spike (TV network) original programming
2007 American television series debuts
2000s American reality television series
2010s American reality television series
2017 American television series endings
English-language television shows
Television shows set in Clark County, Nevada
Penal system in the United States